The Platinum Collection is a compilation album by the American rock band the Doors, released in 2008. It includes mostly songs that were not record chart hits for the group.
The compilation released in the UK & Europe, label Rhino Records/Warner Platinum – serie: 8122-79930-4.

Critical reception

James Christopher Monger, in a review for AllMusic, gave the album one and a half out of five stars. He wrote:

Track listing
 "Moonlight Drive"
 "Soul Kitchen"
 "Bird of Prey"
 "Take It as It Comes"
 "You're Lost Little Girl"
 "My Eyes Have Seen You"
 "The WASP (Texas Radio and the Big Beat)"
 "Summer's Almost Gone" (40th anniversary mix)
 "The Spy"
 "Tell All the People"
 "Queen of the Highway"
 "Shaman's Blues"
 "Hyacinth House"
 "Cars Hiss by My Window"
 "Love Street"

Personnel
Jim Morrison – vocals
Robby Krieger – guitar
Ray Manzarek – piano, organ
John Densmore – drums

References

2008 greatest hits albums
Albums produced by Paul A. Rothchild
The Doors compilation albums
Elektra Records compilation albums
Rhino Records compilation albums